Victor Stanley (1892–1939) was a British film actor.

Selected filmography
 The World, the Flesh, the Devil (1932) - Jim Stanger
 The Iron Stair (1933) - Ben
 The Ghost Camera (1933) - Albert Sims
 Puppets of Fate (1933)
 Timbuctoo (1933) - Henry
 This Week of Grace (1933)
 His Grace Gives Notice (1933) - James Roper
 The House of Trent (1933) - Spriggs
 Three Men in a Boat (1933) - Cockney
 The Umbrella (1933) - Victor Garnett 
 The Medicine Man (1933) - Bitoff
 The Four Masked Men (1934) - Potter
 Whispering Tongues (1934) - Ship's Steward
 The Lash (1934) - Jake
 Open All Night (1934)
 School for Stars (1935) - Bill
 Gentlemen's Agreement (1935) - Williams
 Tropical Trouble (1936) - Albert
 Aren't Men Beasts! (1937) - Harry Harper (Last appearance)

References

External links

1892 births
1939 deaths
English male film actors
Actors from Shropshire
20th-century English male actors